Terrance A. "Terry" Braunstein (born April 18, 1939)  is a Canadian retired curler. He skipped Team Manitoba to winning the 1965 Brier, and later went on to win a silver medal at the Curling World Championships of that year.

References

Curlers from Winnipeg
1939 births
Brier champions
Jewish Canadian sportspeople
Living people
Canadian male curlers